Paul-Gerhard Klumbies (born 14 August 1957) is a German Protestant theologian and New Testament scholar.

Education and academic career
Klumbies studied from 1976 Protestant theology first in Bethel, then Erlangen, Hamburg and Münster. He completed his theological qualifications in 1982 and 1984 at the Lippische Landeskirche in Detmold. From 1984 to 1988 he was a scientific assistant in the field of New Testament at the Kirchliche Hochschule Bethel, where he was awarded his Ph.D. in 1988. From 1988 to 1993 he was parish vicar and parish pastor in Bad Salzuflen.

From 1993 to 2004 he was Professor of Protestant Theology with a focus on New Testament and Diaconal Studies at the Evangelical University of Applied Sciences Freiburg. In 2000 he lectured in New Testament at the Department of Protestant Theology at the University of Hamburg.

Since 2004 he has served as Professor of Biblical Sciences with particular interest in the New Testament at the University of Kassel. He works in the Department of Humanities and Cultural Studies as part of the Institute of Protestant Theology.

Contributions
Klumbies 1992 work Die Rede von Gott bei Paulus in ihrem zeitgeschichtlichen Kontext caught the attention of Larry W. Hurtado regarding his view of the Pauline theology. He sees Paul's theology as seen through the 'lens' of his understanding of who Jesus is, his Christology.

In his work of 2015 Herkunft und Horizont der Theologie des Neuen Testaments he drew attention to the need to recall the 'transcendence of God' in our remembering true theology is the purpose and not just a methodology.

Personal life
Klumbies is married and has two children.

Works

Books

As editor

References

External links

1957 births
Living people
New Testament scholars
German biblical scholars
German Lutheran theologians
Academic staff of the University of Freiburg
Academic staff of the University of Kassel
Lutheran biblical scholars